Chinese Korean or Korean Chinese may refer to:
Sino-Korean vocabulary, Chinese loanwords in the Korean language
People's Republic of China – North Korea relations
People's Republic of China – South Korea relations
Republic of China – North Korea relations
Republic of China – South Korea relations
Ethnic Chinese in Korea (also known as Hwagyo)
Koreans in China (also known as Joseonjok or Chaoxianzu)
Korean Chinese cuisine, a cuisine developed in South Korea derived from Chinese cuisine
Korean language in China (also known as Jungguk Joseonmal)

See also
Chinese-language literature of Korea